The Thrifty Pig (aka Thrifty Pig and Walt Disney's The Thrifty Pig) is a 1941 four-minute educational short animated film made by the Walt Disney Studios, for the National Film Board of Canada. The film was released theatrically on November 19, 1941, as part of a series of four films directed at the Canadian public to learn about war bonds during the Second World War. The Thrifty Pig was directed by Ford Beebe. It is also a remake of the 1933 film of the same name

The Thrifty Pig features reused and reconfigured animation from Three Little Pigs (1933). Although in production prior to the Attack on Pearl Harbor, the film is an example of a World War II propaganda film.

Plot
Practical Pig, Fiddler Pig and Fifer Pig are three brothers who build their own houses with bricks, sticks and straw respectively. Practical Pig warns his brothers to build their house with "War Savings Certificate" bricks so that the house will be a solid defence against the marauding Wolf. Fifer and Fiddler ignore him and continue to play, singing "Who's Afraid of the Big Bad Wolf?".

As they are singing, the Big Bad Wolf in Nazi swastika regalia attacks the two spendthrifts and blows Fifer's straw house down. Fifer manages to escape and hides at Fiddler's stick house but the Wolf also blows it down. The two pigs run and hide at Practical's brick house. The Wolf then tries to blow down the strong brick house (losing his clothing in the process) but is unable to make much progress, as the bricks have made a strong foundation.

Finally, Practical Pig chases the wolf away in a flurry of bricks that unerringly hit the Nazi marauder in his rear. The three pigs then sing "Who's Afraid of the Big Bad Wolf?" but with the caution that their house has to be in order to keep the wolf away.

A pastiche of war scenes follows, each of which ends with a message (such as an aircraft shooting out the message "Invest in Victory"). Other messages show the importance of spending less as well as lending savings to create the weapons of war. They recommend purchasing war savings certificates, which are sold in a "Five for Four" arrangement,

Characters
 Three Little Pigs (voiced by Pinto Colvig, Mary Moder and Dorothy Compton)
 Big Bad Wolf (as a Nazi German) (voiced by Billy Bletcher)

Production  
With the outbreak of a global war, Walt Disney Studios felt a great pinch in their finances due to the loss of much of their European markets. This was further limited with the invasion of France by Nazi forces in 1940, which meant that the next Disney release Pinocchio (1940) was only dubbed in Spanish and Portuguese, a great deal fewer languages than previous Disney works.

Due to this loss of profit, and losses on recent films, Disney studios faced a bleak outlook of a deficit of over half a million dollars, layoffs and pay cuts for the first time in the studio, and a $2.23 million ceiling on their credit allowance. With bleak prospects, the studio was made into a corporation in April 1940, which raised $3.6 million to help pay off debts owed by the studio. To enable his studios to keep afloat and producing films, Walt Disney sought out external funding to cover production costs, which would allow him to keep employees on the payroll and keep the studio working.

On March 3, 1941, Disney invited over three dozen different representatives of various national defence industries to a lunch meeting, in an attempt to solicit work from them. He followed this luncheon with formal letters offering work “For national defence industries at cost, and without profit. In making this offer, I am motivated solely by a desire to help as best I can in the present emergency.” Four Methods of Flush Riveting (1941) was first training film that was commissioned by Lockheed Aircraft.

In response to Disney's efforts, John Grierson, the head of the National Film Board of Canada entered into a co-production agreement for four animated films to promote the Canadian War Savings Plan. In addition, a training film for the Canadian Army, that eventually became Stop That Tank! (1942) was commissioned.

Reception
While intended for a theatrical audience, The Thrifty Pig, along with the other three films in the series, was effective in delivering its message to Canadians through their local War Savings Committee. When America entered the war, these shorts were later released as part of the eight bond drives in the United States.

Home media
The short was released on May 18, 2004 on Walt Disney Treasures: Walt Disney on the Front Lines.

See also
 Blitz Wolf
 List of World War II short films
 Walt Disney's World War II propaganda production

References

Notes

Citations

Bibliography

 Barrier, Michael. Hollywood Cartoons: American Animation in its Golden Age. New York: Oxford University Press, 2003. .
 Cheu, Johnson. (Ed.). Diversity in Disney Films: Critical Essays on Race, Ethnicity, Gender, Sexuality and Disability. Jefferson, North Carolina: McFarland & Company, 2013. .
 Gabler, Neal. Walt Disney: The Triumph of the American Imagination. New York: Vintage, 2007. .
 Maltin, Leonard. The Disney Films (4th Edition). New York: JessieFilms Ltd., 2000. .
 Shull, Michael S. and David E. Wilt. Doing Their Bit: Wartime American Animated Short Films, 1939-1945 (2nd ed.) Jefferson, North Carolina: McFarland & Company, Incorporated Publishers, 2004. .
 Telotte, J. P. Animating Space: From Mickey to WALL-E. United States: The University Press of Kentucky, 2010. . 
 Van Riper, Bowdoin A. Learning from Mickey, Donald and Walt: Essays on Disney’s Edutainment films. Jefferson, North Carolina: McFarland & Company, 2011. .

External links
 
 

1941 short films
1941 animated films
1940s Disney animated short films
Films directed by Ford Beebe
Films produced by Walt Disney
National Film Board of Canada animated short films
Canadian World War II propaganda shorts
Films based on The Three Little Pigs
Canadian animated short films
Quebec films
1940s English-language films
Films about pigs
Films about wolves
1940s Canadian films
National Film Board of Canada short films
Canadian educational films
Canadian comedy short films